The year 1887 in film involved some significant events.

Events
Hannibal Goodwin files for a patent for his photographic film.
Louis Le Prince's 16-lens camera (LPCC Type-16) is made in the United States and the film Man Walking Around a Corner is filmed using it this year.
August – Harvey Henderson Wilcox registers his 120-acre ranch with the Los Angeles County Recorder's office, calling the area it is based in, Hollywood, which would later become the home of the U.S. film industry.

Films 
Man Walking Around a Corner, directed by Louis Le Prince.  The oldest known film.

Births

External links 
 . Retrieved 2009-06-04.
 

 
Film by year
Film